

Free Wheelchair Mission

Overview 
The Free Wheelchair Mission is an international faith-based nonprofit, humanitarian organization providing wheelchairs for people with disabilities in developing nations who do not have the resources to obtain one, of whom the World Health Organization estimates number over 70 million.

Impact 
The Free Wheelchair Mission has given away over 1 million wheelchairs to people in need in over 94 countries.

Headquartered in Irvine, California, this organization was founded by Dr. Don Schoendorfer, who has a PhD in biomedical engineering from MIT and owns over 60 patents. In 2008, Schoendorfer was awarded the civilian Above and Beyond Medal of Honor by retired General Colin Powell at a ceremony at Arlington National Cemetery.

Other awards received by the organization and/or its founder include the CLASSY Award for Health and Well-being in 2012; the US House of Representatives Certificate of Special Congressional Recognition in 2010; the White House Faith-Based Initiatives “Portraits of Compassion- International Service” in 2008; the White House Call to Service Award in 2007; a Proclamation from Chicago Mayor Richard M. Daley in 2007; the Entrepreneur Dream Award from Loyola Marymount University in 2006; a Certificate of Recognition from the California State Assembly in 2006; and the Top Orange County Nonprofit by OC Coast Magazine Community Awards in 2014.

Working in partnership with other like-minded groups, Free Wheelchair Mission has distributed wheelchairs in over 94 developing countries around the world, delivering its one-millionth wheelchair in mid-2017.

Funding for the wheelchairs are provided by private and public donations including individuals, groups, corporations, churches, universities, and foundations. To save on costs and ensure quality control, the wheelchairs are shipped from the factory by the container and assembled by pre-approved distribution partners in recipient countries, which will then be distributed and given to recipients.

Wheelchairs 
Free Wheelchair Mission wheelchairs include the GEN_1 wheelchair, the original design; the GEN_2 wheelchair, a more customized fit that received FDA clearance in 2012; and the GEN_3 wheelchair, a foldable version of the GEN_2 for ease in transportation and storage that received FDA clearance in 2013. The GEN_2 and GEN_3 come in four sizes: small, medium, large, and extra-large, and can be appropriately adjusted to fit each recipient.

Recognition 
In August 2019, the organization was featured by Harry and Meghan, the Duke and Duchess of Sussex, on their Instagram feed along with other organizations including the Earth Day Network and BlinkNow Foundation.

References

External links 

 Official website

Charities based in California
Wheelchair organizations
501(c)(3) organizations